Hespererato rubra is a species of small sea snail, a marine gastropod mollusk in the family Eratoidae, the false cowries or trivias and allies

Distribution
This marine species occurs off Cebu Island.

References

 Fehse D. (2016). Contributions to the knowledge of the Eratoidae. XI. New species in the genus Hespererato F.A. Schilder, 1925. Neptunea. 14(1): 30–36. page(s): 33, pl. 2 figs 1–3

Eratoidae
Gastropods described in 2016